Rain Forests, Oceans and Other Themes is an album by American fingerstyle guitarist and composer John Fahey, released in 1985.

Reception

CMJ New Music wrote that Fahey's "... newest work is slightly more subdued than last year's Let Go, but equally as radiant. A nimble-fingered master... Fahey has continually created profound expressions on the acoustic guitar, in a mystical yet intimate setting".

Track listing
Side One
 "Melody McOcean" (Fahey) – 6:42
 "Rain Forest" (Fahey) – 6:47
 "Lullaby and Finale from the Firebird" (Igor Stravinsky) – 4:19
 "Atlantic High" (Fahey) – 2:08
 "Samba de Orfeo" (Luiz Bonfá) – 3:10

Side Two
 "Theme and Variations" (Louis Hardin) – 3:00
 "May This Be Love/Casey Jones" (Jimi Hendrix, Furry Lewis) – 3:28
 "Intro to Ocean Waves/Ocean Waves" (Fahey, Bola Sete) – 6:31
 "Jiroscho Ascopi" (Fahey, Terry Robb) – 5:20
 "Saint Patrick's Hymn" (Traditional) – 2:38

Note that both "Layla" and "The World Is Waiting for the Sunrise" were originally issued on the previous year's Let Go album, and did not appear on the vinyl release. They were added to the CD version several years later to give additional value.

Personnel
John Fahey – guitar
Terry Robb – guitar, bottleneck guitar
Guy Maxwell – percussion, drum machine
Scott White – bass
Production notes
John Fahey – producer
Terry Robb – producer
Bernie Grundman – mastering
Susan Marsh – design

References

1985 albums
John Fahey (musician) albums
Albums produced by John Fahey (musician)